Sepicciano is a frazione of the municipality of Piedimonte Matese, in Campania, Southern Italy.

References

Frazioni of the Province of Caserta